Arthur Malone (June 3, 1936 – March 29, 2013; Tampa, Florida) was an American race car driver who was successful in both drag racing and American open-wheel car racing, an unusual combination of skills.

Career
Malone is known primarily for having been a drag racer and was the 1963 AHRA Top Fuel World champion.
In 1959, he drove for Don Garlits.
He is in the AHRA Hall of Fame.

He was the first to attain  at Daytona International Speedway.

Malone also raced in the USAC Championship Car series in the 1962-1965 seasons, with 10 career starts, including the 1963 and 1964 Indianapolis 500 races. Both years Malone drove cars powered by the legendary Novi engine, owned by Andy Granatelli. He had gained Granatelli's attention after his Daytona record.  Art Malone's best finish at Indy came in 1964, where he started the race in 30th position, and finished a very respectable 11th.

Accident and death
Malone was injured in an airboat accident in the early 2010s; failing to fully recover from his injuries, he died on March 29, 2013.

References

1936 births
2013 deaths
Racing drivers from Tampa, Florida
Dragster drivers
Indianapolis 500 drivers
NASCAR drivers